Benzofury may refer to:

 5-APB
 5-MAPB
 6-APB
 6-MAPB